The White Planet or in French, La Planète Blanche, is a 2006 documentary about the wildlife of the Arctic.

It shows interactions between marine animals, birds and land animals, especially the polar bear, over a one-year period. The fragility of the Arctic is hinted at as a reason to prevent climate change. It was nominated for the Documentary category in the 27th Genie Awards in 2007.

External links
The White Planet - official site (French)
National Film Board of Canada webpage
The White Planet - Australian mirror site

Documentary films about nature
Canadian documentary films
Quebec films
2006 films
Documentary films about the Arctic
National Film Board of Canada documentaries
2006 documentary films
Films scored by Bruno Coulais
2000s French-language films
French-language Canadian films
2000s Canadian films